Cecil Richard Norgate (10 November 1921 – 7 October 2008) was the Anglican Bishop of Masasi from 1984 until 1992.

His father was Cecil Francis Norgate, Rector of Great Casterton, near Stamford, Lincolnshire, from 1928 until his death in 1953. His mother died in 1928. He was educated at Stamford School and St Chad's College, Durham University where his study of Theology was interrupted by the war. After World War Two service with the Royal Navy, he was ordained in 1950. After a curacy at St Peter's, Wallsend he became a missionary priest with the Universities' Mission to Central Africa in Masasi, Tanganyika. After long service he became Bishop of the diocese after no suitable Tanzanian-born candidate could be identified and after retirement continued to live in the country until his death.

References

1921 births
People educated at Stamford School
Alumni of St Chad's College, Durham
Anglican bishops of Masasi
2008 deaths
People from Stamford, Lincolnshire
People from Great Casterton